Taxiárchis is a village located near Mount Holomontas in Polygyros, Chalkidiki, Central Macedonia, Greece. Locals are involved in the cultivation of firs for the Greek Christmas tree market. The chapel of Agia Paraskevi is located in the village.

Villages in Greece
Populated places in Chalkidiki